Neper is a logarithmic unit of ratio.

Neper may also refer to:
John Napier, a Scottish mathematician
Neper (crater), a lunar impact crater
Neper (mythology), an Egyptian deity

See also 
 Napier (disambiguation)